The following is a list of Audi concept cars.

Concept cars

References